The Nazi Boni University (Université Nazi Boni)  is a university in Bobo-Dioulasso, Houet Province, Burkina Faso. It is one of three public universities in Burkina Faso (the others are the University of Koudougou and the University of Ouagadougou).

History 
The university opened in 1995, under the name of Polytechnic University of Bobo-Dioulasso.

In 2010/2011 it had around 2,600 students.

In 2017, it was renamed Nazi Boni University, in honor of Nazi Boni.

References

Universities and colleges in Burkina Faso
Educational institutions established in 1995
Bobo-Dioulasso
1995 establishments in Burkina Faso